Thomas Niederstrasser (born 13 March 1965) is a retired Austrian football defender.

References

1965 births
Living people
Austrian footballers
First Vienna FC players
Association football defenders
Austrian Football Bundesliga players